St John of God Berwick Hospital is a 202-bed hospital, including 12 beds in the Day Oncology Centre, located at 75 Kangan Drive, Berwick. It provides health care to Melbourne's south east and regional eastern Victoria.

Originally known as Berwick Hospital, the facility was taken over by St John of God Health Care in 2003.  The original hospital was established in 1939 as Berwick Bush Nursing Hospital.

St John of God Berwick Hospital is a division of St John of God Health Care, a leading Catholic not-for-profit health care group, serving communities with hospitals, home nursing, and social outreach services throughout Australia and New Zealand.

Redevelopment
Construction of the new St John of God Berwick Hospital facility at 75 Kangan Dr, Berwick started in January 2016 and opened on 18 January 2018. The new hospital provides 202 beds, including 12 beds in the Day Oncology Centre, eight operating theatres, two procedure rooms, a cardiovascular interventional laboratory, six birth suites and the first intensive care and cardiac care unit for the region.

The old 82-bed hospital on Gibb Street, Berwick is now known as St John of God Langmore Centre, which provides mental health care, including a perinatal mental health inpatient service, for the south east Melbourne community

Services
The services provided by St John of God Berwick hospital include:
 Day surgery
 Medical and surgical services
 Obstetrics and gynaecology
 Special care nursery
 Oncology
 Elective surgery
 Medical care
 Endoscopy
 Critical care

St John of God Healthcare at Home
In 2010, St John of God Health Care launched Healthcare at Home, previously known as Health Choices, in Berwick. The service provides home-based nursing care in Victoria's Casey/Cardinia region.

Social outreach
St John of God Raphael Services provides perinatal infant mental health care and research in Berwick. Staffed by mental health clinicians, Raphael Services provide free support for parents and families affected by anxiety, depression and other mental health difficulties during pregnancy and in the postnatal period. They services also provide counselling and support for parents undergoing prenatal testing or who have experienced pregnancy loss.

See also
List of hospitals in Australia

References

External links
Official website
Sisters of St John of God website

Hospital buildings completed in 1939
Hospitals in Melbourne
1939 establishments in Australia
St John of God Health Care
Buildings and structures in the City of Casey